Events from the year 1988 in Denmark.

Incumbents
 Monarch – Margrethe II
 Prime minister – Poul Schlüter

Events
 3 November – The old main post office in Købmagergade, Copenhagen, is robbed by what is later to become known as Blekinge Street Gang. One policeman is killed under the robbery.

The arts

Architecture

Film
 23 May – Bille August's film Pelle the Conqueror wins the Palme d'Or at the 41st Cannes Film Festival.

Literature

Music

Classical music
 27 November – Frederik Magle's Cantata for choir and chamber orchestra We Are Afraid (Vi er bange) is premiered in Grundtvig's Church, Copenhagen.

Sports
 17 September – 2 October – Denmark at the 1988 Summer Olympics in Seoul: 2 gold medals, 1 silver medal and 1 bronze medals.

Badminton
 Triton BK Aalborg wins silver at Europe Cup.
 20 March  Ib Frederiksen wins gold in men's single at the 1988 All England Open Badminton Championships.
 10–18 April – With five gold medals, three silver medals and two bronze medals, Denmark finishes as the best nation at the 11th European Badminton Championships in Kristiansand, Norway.

Cycling
 21 July  Johnny Weltz wins Stage 19 of the 1988 Tour de France.
 21–25 August   Denmark wins two bronze medals at the 1988 UCI Track Cycling World Championships.
 Roman Hermann (LIE) and Hans-Henrik Ørsted (DEN) win the Six Days of Copenhagen sox-day track cycling race.

Football
 10–25 June – Denmark participates in the UEFA Euro 1988 but does not make it beyond the initial group stage after finishing last in Group A.

Births
 9 January – Michael Lumb, footballer
 16 January – Nicklas Bendtner, footballer
 7 February – Nicki Bille Nielsen, footballer
 9 February – Lotte Friis, swimmer
 17 February – Alex Vargas, singer
 25 July – Hedegaard, DJ and music producer
 18 September – Lukas Forchhammer, singer, songwriter and actor
 23 October – Nicolaj Agger, footballer

Deaths
 5 November – C. F. Møller, architect (born 1898)

See also
1988 in Danish television

References

 
Denmark
Years of the 20th century in Denmark
1980s in Denmark